The 2001 IAAF Grand Prix Final was the seventeenth edition of the season-ending competition for the IAAF Grand Prix track and field circuit, organised by the International Association of Athletics Federations. It was held on 9 September at the Olympic Park Stadium in Melbourne, Australia. It was the first and only time that the event was held in the southern hemisphere (international track and field seasons typically revolve around a northern hemisphere schedule).

André Bucher (800 metres) and Violeta Szekely (1500 metres) were the overall points winners of the tournament. A total of 19 athletics events were contested, nine for men and ten for women. This was the first time that women's events outnumbered men's on the programme of the IAAF Grand Prix Final.

Medal summary

Men

Women

References

IAAF Grand Prix Final. GBR Athletics. Retrieved on 2015-01-17.

External links
IAAF Grand Prix Final archive from IAAF

Grand Prix Final
Grand Prix Final
International athletics competitions hosted by Australia
Sports competitions in Melbourne
2000s in Melbourne
IAAF Grand Prix Final
September 2001 sports events in Australia